The Hostage is a 1917 American silent drama film directed by Robert Thornby and written by Beulah Marie Dix. The film stars Wallace Reid, Dorothy Abril, Gertrude Short, Clarence Geldart, Guy Oliver, and Marcia Manon. The film was released on September 10, 1917, by Paramount Pictures.

Plot

Cast 
Wallace Reid as Lieutenant Kemper
Dorothy Abril as Nathalia
Gertrude Short as Sophia 
Clarence Geldart as Brigadier 
Guy Oliver as Vanvoyd
Marcia Manon as Eunice 
Noah Beery, Sr. as Boyadi
George Spaulding as Ragnor
Lillian Leighton as Marienka
Lucien Littlefield as Paul

Reception
Like many American films of the time, The Hostage was subject to cuts by city and state film censorship boards. The Chicago Board of Censors ordered cut the first two torture scenes and the flashing of four additional torture scenes.

References

External links 
 

1917 films
1910s English-language films
Silent American drama films
1917 drama films
Paramount Pictures films
Films directed by Robert Thornby
American black-and-white films
American silent feature films
1910s American films